Torgny Säve-Söderbergh (born 29 June 1914 in Lund; died 21 May 1998 in Uppsala) was a Swedish writer, translator, and professor of Egyptology at Uppsala University from 1950 to 1980. He was the younger brother of paleontologist Gunnar Säve-Söderbergh.

Education and career
Torgny Säve-Söderbergh was born in Lund on 29 June 1914 to Gotthard Söderbergh and Anna Säve.

Säve-Söderbergh studied at the University of Göttingen. He then attended the Uppsala University for his doctoral studies and was awarded his doctorate at the age of 27 for his thesis Ägypten und Nubien (1941, written in German). After graduating, he performed archaeological and historical research. From 1935-1950, he participated in archaeological excavations in Greece and Turkey (1935, 1938-1939) and in Egypt (1937, 1950). From 1942-1980, he was a lecturer, then professor of Egyptology (1950) and dean (1960-1965) of the Faculty of Arts at the Uppsala University.

He also served as Director of the Museum of Egyptian Antiquities in Uppsala from 1950-1980. From 1960-1964, he was directed excavations during the Scandinavian expedition in Sudanese Nubia. He was also the director of the Nag Hammadi expedition from 1976-1977.

In addition to his research, he also help to popularise archaeology and research, giving radio talks and writing popular books such as Egyptian Character (1945) and Pharaohs and Men (1958).

When the Aswan Dam was being built in the 1960s, Säve-Söderbergh became project leader for a joint Scandinavian expedition (1960-1964) in UNESCO's campaign to save temples and historical monuments from flooding - the International Campaign to Save the Monuments of Nubia. The entire area was archaeologically investigated, and a large number of temples were saved. The wealth of findings and data from the expedition was published in 14 volumes edited by Säve-Söderbergh. He published his story of the expedition in the popular book Mission in Nubia: How the World Saved a Country's Cultural Monuments (1996).

Books
Popular books in Swedish:

Egyptisk egenart ("Egyptian Character") (1945)
Faraoner och människor ("Pharaohs and Men") (1958)
Uppdrag Nubien: hur varlden raddade ett lands kulturminnen ("Mission in Nubia: How the World Saved a Country's Cultural Monuments") (1996)

Affiliations
Säve-Söderbergh was a member of the following academies and organisations:

Royal Swedish Academy of Sciences (secretary, president)
Royal Swedish Academy of Letters, History and Antiquities
Royal Society of Sciences in Uppsala
Royal Society of the Humanities at Uppsala
Royal Society of Arts and Sciences of Uppsala

References

1914 births
1998 deaths
Swedish Egyptologists
Uppsala University alumni
Academic staff of Uppsala University
Swedish archaeologists
Members of the Royal Swedish Academy of Sciences